The 2006 North Indian Ocean cyclone season had no bounds, but cyclones tend to form between April and December, with peaks in May and November. These dates conventionally delimit the period of each year when most tropical cyclones form in the northern Indian Ocean.

The scope of this basin is north of the Equator and west of the Malay Peninsula. The IMD and JTWC monitor this basin. This basin is divided in two seas by India, the Bay of Bengal and Arabian Sea, abbreviated BOB and ARB, respectively.

Although an inactive year, 2006 had more of note than previous years like 2005 or 2004. Cyclone Mala caused severe damage and killed 22 when it hit Burma as a cat. 3. An unnamed depression killed over 100 in India, and cyclonic storm Ogni caused minor effects in India as well. Additionally, the remnants of Typhoon Durian crossed the Malay Peninsula causing minor effects, but was a rare basin-crosser in this area.


Season summary 

Overall activity across the North Indian Ocean during 2006 was slightly below-average, with 12 depressions, 3 cyclonic storms, and 1 very severe cyclonic storm. An average season, according to the IMD, consists of 15 depressions and 5–6 cyclonic storms. In addition to the storms monitored by the IMD, the JTWC also tracked the remnants of Typhoon Durian across the Malay Peninsula into the Andaman Sea as a tropical depression in early December. The majority of storms formed within the Bay of Bengal, with only two existing in the Arabian Sea. Activity peaked during the summer due to an active southwest monsoon.

Starting in May, the seasonal monsoon developed over the Bay of Bengal and advanced northwestward over India where it propagated through September. During this period the system spawned numerous disturbances, nine of which became tropical cyclones. All but one of these systems formed in the northern Bay of Bengal and struck Odisha before spreading rain across large portions of India. The outlier was Severe Cyclonic Storm Mukda in late September which remained virtually stationary its entire existence to the southwest of Gujarat. The combined effects of the eight other depressions along with the monsoon itself caused disastrous flooding throughout India. By early August, nearly 500,000 people were evacuated in Mumbai due to rising waters. The collective effects of the depressions alone resulted in at least 562 fatalities with hundreds more attributed to the monsoon rains. More than 1 million people across Odisha were left homeless from the storms.

During periods of cyclonic activity, rainfall associated with the monsoon was above-average as a whole. Departures from average reached 13.8%, 26.2%, 28.1%, 9.8%, and 11.5% for the periods of July 5–12 (BOB 02), August 2–9 (BOB 03), August 9–16 (BOB 04), September 20–27 (Land 01 and Mukda), and September 27–October 5 (BOB 08), respectively. In contrast to the notable activity of the monsoon in respect to tropical cyclone formation, rainfall from the monsoon across India was predominantly below-average due to poor distribution of rain. Of the four broadly defined regions of India used by the IMD, only Central India experienced above-average rainfall, possibly due to the multiple cyclones that passed through the region. In addition, five sub-divisions (the Andaman and Nicobar Islands, Arunachal Pradesh, Assam and Meghalaya, west Uttar Pradesh, and Haryana) experienced drought conditions.

Systems

Deep Depression ARB 01 

The first system of the year was the seventh storm to form in the northern Indian Ocean since September 2005, and a rare January system. It originated from an area of convection south of Sri Lanka, located in an area of low wind shear. The thunderstorms increased as outflow improved. On January 13, the IMD classified the system as a depression south of the southernmost point of India. The system moved west-northwestward into the southeastern Arabian Sea. Late that day, the JTWC classified the system as Tropical Cyclone 01A. Subsequently, the circulation became disorganized and convection dwindled due to increased wind shear, although its outskirts brought light rainfall to southwest India. Around 00:00 UTC on January 15, the system degenerated into a remnant low. The remnants continued westward across the Arabian Sea, dissipating completely on January 19.

Extremely Severe Cyclonic Storm Mala 

In mid-April, an area of disturbed weather formed over the southern Bay of Bengal and nearby Andaman Sea. Over a period of several days, the system became increasingly organized and was classified as a depression on April 24. Situated within a region of weak steering currents, the storm slowly intensified as it drifted in a general northward direction. It attained gale-force winds and was named Mala the next day. Conditions for strengthening improved markedly on April 27 and Mala subsequently underwent rapid intensification. Subsequently, the cyclone attained its peak intensity. The JTWC considered Mala to have been slightly stronger, classifying it as a Category 4-equivalent cyclone. Steady weakening ensued thereafter and the storm made landfall in Myanmar's Rakhine State on April 29. Rapid dissipation took place after it made landfall and Mala was last noted early the next morning.

In contrast to Mala's intensity, damage was relatively minimal across Myanmar due to adequate early warnings, while timely and effective evacuations minimized loss of life along the coast. The greatest damage resulted from a thunderstorm near Yangon on April 28 that spawned a possible tornado in an industrial zone. A total of 586 homes were damaged there. Just outside the city in the Hinthada District, a flash flood killed at least 18 people. Overall, the storm claimed 37 lives in the country and left US$6.7 million in damage. In the wake of Mala, the Red Cross distributed relief aid to affected residents while local officials set up shelters to house those left homeless. Government and social organizations donated 5.4 million kyat (US$4,320) in cash to survivors in the Ayeyarwady Region.

Deep Depression BOB 02 

In late June, an area of disturbed weather persisted over the northern Bay of Bengal, unusually far south for a monsoonal system for this time of year. Convergence from the monsoon enhanced convection to the southwest of a developing low-pressure area; however, strong wind shear was expected to prevent tropical cyclogenesis. However, the system rapidly organized into a deep depression by July 2, at which time it was situated 240 km (150 mi) south of Calcutta, India. This marked only the second time since 1981 that the JTWC had monitored a July storm with gale-force winds in the basin. Weak steering currents prompted the a slow, westward track and just three hours later, the cyclone made landfall between Paradeep and Chandabali in Odisha. A pressure of 982 mb (hPa; 29.00 inHg), the lowest in relation to the storm, was measured in Bhubaneswar as the deep depression moved through. Once onshore, steady weakening took place and the depression ultimately degenerated into a remnant low on July 5 over Vidarbha.

Owing to the cyclone's monsoonal nature, it produced heavy rains across a large swath of India and encompassed both coastlines. The hardest hit areas were Odisha and Vidarbha, where 36 and 41 people were killed, respectively. At least five of the deaths were from fishermen who drowned offshore while the others resulted from landslides or building collapses. In the nearby states, Andhra Pradesh, Jharkhand, Karnataka, a further 30 people were killed collectively from flooding and mudslides. The normally slow-moving Saglana River burst its banks in Bhavnagar, Gujarat, and left most of the city submerged. Several homes collapsed and power supply became erratic. At least two people lost their lives in the city. A further 24 people were killed in the Navsari district after two rivers flooded surrounding areas.

Depression BOB 07 

A low-pressure area formed over northwest Bay of Bengal on 2 September. It concentrated into a depression the next day and crossed the north Orissa coast near Chandbali in the early morning of 4 September. Govindpur in Orissa recorded 150 mm of rainfall on 4 September.

Land Depression 01 

The United States Naval Research Laboratory previously monitored the system as an area of interest before it moved inland near the border of India and Bangladesh. The depression degenerated into a low-pressure area on September 24 and dissipated later that day. Torrential downpours caused flooding that killed more than 170 people and left around 375,000 homeless in eastern India and Bangladesh. Tantloi in West Bengal received 370 mm of rainfall in 48 hours between 22 and 23 September.

Severe Cyclonic Storm Mukda 

An area of convection persisted west of India on September 18 within a broad trough. Low wind shear allowed for gradual organization as the system moved westward. The thunderstorms organized about an exposed circulation. Early on September 21, the IMD classified it as a depression about 450 km (280 mi) southwest of Porbandar, Gujarat. Around the same time, the JTWC began issuing warnings on the system as Tropical Cyclone 04A. The system remained nearly stationary and quickly organized. By 12:00 UTC on September 22, the IMD had upgraded it to a severe cyclonic storm, giving it the name Mukda. By that time, Mukda had developed an eye-feature in the center of the convection, although it failed to organize further.

The storm initially drifted toward Gujarat, bringing isolated heavy rainfall along the coastline; Upleta received  during the storm's passage. However, Mukda steadily weakened while remaining nearly stationary. Late on September 24, the system degenerated into a remnant low. The remnants turned westward, maintaining a distinct circulation and occasionally redeveloping thunderstorms, but failing to reorganize.

Depression BOB 08 

It made landfall on September 29 near Gopalpur, Odisha before dissipating overland. Mahendragarh in Orissa received 170 mm of rainfall on 30 September.

Cyclonic Storm Ogni 

On October 27, an area of convection formed west of Sri Lanka, spawning a circulation in the Palk Strait on the next day. With low to moderate wind shear, the system's convection organized and developed outflow. Early on October 29, a depression developed just east of India's southeast coast. Conditions favored development, with the exception of proximity to land. The convection organized around the center, and developed banding features, although Ogni weakened slightly to deep depression status on October 30. Soon after, it moved ashore Andhra Pradesh between Bapatla and Ongole. Later that day, Ogni degenerated into a remnant low.

A small system only 100 km (60 mi) in diameter, Ogni was the smallest storm on record in the basin from 1891 to 2007. About 900 villages were flooded in the state, with around 100,000 houses damaged or destroyed. Thousands of residents rode out floods on the roofs of their houses and 95,928 people had to evacuate to hundreds of emergency camps. The storm also disrupted power supplies and cut off roads. Ogni's rainfall damaged  of crop fields and killed 361,553 farm animals. Throughout Andhra Pradesh, Ogni killed 24 people, mostly on rice or shrimp farms. Damage totaled ₹2.1 billion (INR, US$47 million).

Other systems 

During August 2006, a series of depressions formed in the Bay of Bengal, despite August typically being a climatologically quiet month.

The first originated out of an area of convection that persisted on August 1. A circulation exited from land into the northern portion of the bay, and despite high wind shear it developed into a depression on August 2 just 100 km (65 mi) offshore Chandabali. The system moved west-southwestward and quickly intensified into a deep depression, reaching winds of  according to the IMD. Early on August 3, the system moved ashore Odisha between Puri and Gopalpur. It progressed inland and weakened, degenerating into a remnant low-pressure area on August 5.

About a week later, a low-pressure area formed on August 11 in the northern Bay of Bengal. By the next day, it organized into a depression, and quickly made landfall on Odisha near Balasore. The depression degenerated into a remnant low on August 13.

Another depression developed on August 16 in the same region, moving ashore later that day near Chandabali. It moved northwestward due to a ridge to the north, weakening into a remnant low on August 18 over Madhya Pradesh.

On August 29, the final of the four depressions formed near the Odisha coast, quickly moving ashore near Paradip. Like the preceding storm, it moved northwestward, dissipating on September 1 over Madhya Pradesh.

The series of depressions produced heavy rainfall in Odisha and Andhra Pradesh. Collectively, the depressions killed 387 people, with the first deep depression alone responsible for 251 fatalities. The deaths occurred in Odisha, Andhra Pradesh, Madhya Pradesh, Chhattisgarh, Vidarbha, and Marathawada.

On December 6, the JTWC tracked the remnants of Typhoon Durian across Thailand into the Andaman Sea as a tropical depression. The system degenerated into a remnant low on the next day and continued across the Bay of Bengal, dissipating on December 9. The IMD did not track the system.

Season effects 
This is a table of all storms in the 2006 North Indian Ocean cyclone season. It mentions all of the season's storms and their names, durations, peak intensities (according to the IMD storm scale), landfall(s) – denoted by areas in parentheses – damages, and death totals. Damage and death totals include the damage and deaths caused when that storm was a precursor wave or extratropical low, and all of the damage figures are in 2006 USD.

|-
| ARB 01 ||  || bgcolor=#| || bgcolor=#| || bgcolor=#|  || Kerala, Lakshadweep ||align="right"|  ||align="right"|  ||
|-
| Mala ||  || bgcolor=#| || bgcolor=#| || bgcolor=#|  || Andaman Islands, Myanmar (Rakhine State), Northern Thailand ||align="right"|  ||align="right"|  ||
|-
| BOB 02 ||  || bgcolor=#| || bgcolor=#| || bgcolor=#|  || East India (Odisha) ||align="right"|  ||align="right"|  ||
|-
| BOB 03 ||  || bgcolor=#| || bgcolor=#| || bgcolor=#|  || East India (Odisha) ||align="right"|  ||align="right"|  ||
|-
| BOB 04 ||  || bgcolor=#| || bgcolor=#| || bgcolor=#|  || East India (Odisha) ||align="right"|  ||align="right"|  ||
|-
| BOB 05 ||  || bgcolor=#| || bgcolor=#| || bgcolor=#|  || East India (Odisha) ||align="right"|  ||align="right"|  ||
|-
| BOB 06 ||  || bgcolor=#| || bgcolor=#| || bgcolor=#|  || East India (Odisha) ||align="right"|  ||align="right"|  ||
|-
| BOB 07 ||  || bgcolor=#| || bgcolor=#| || bgcolor=#|  || East India (Odisha) ||align="right"|  ||align="right"|  ||
|-
| Land 01 ||  || bgcolor=#| || bgcolor=#| || bgcolor=#|  || East India, Bangladesh ||align="right"|  ||align="right"|  ||
|-
| Mukda ||  || bgcolor=#| || bgcolor=#| || bgcolor=#|  || Gujarat ||align="right"|  ||align="right"|  ||
|-
| BOB 08 ||  || bgcolor=#| || bgcolor=#| || bgcolor=#|  || East India (Odisha) ||align="right"|  ||align="right"|  ||
|-
| Ogni ||  || bgcolor=#| || bgcolor=#| || bgcolor=#|  || South India (Andhra Pradesh), Sri Lanka ||align="right"|  ||align="right"|  || 
|-

See also 

 North Indian Ocean tropical cyclone
 Tropical cyclones in 2006
 2006 Atlantic hurricane season
 2006 Pacific hurricane season
 2006 Pacific typhoon season
 South-West Indian Ocean cyclone seasons: 2005–06, 2006–07
 Australian region cyclone seasons: 2005–06, 2006–07
 South Pacific cyclone seasons: 2005–06, 2006–07

References

External links 
 WMO/ESCAP Panel on Tropical Cyclones Thirty-fourth session 

 
2006 NIO